Valakampiai Bridge also known as Valakupiai Bridge is a bridge across Neris River, that connects Žirmūnai and Antakalnis districts of Vilnius. Built in 1972. As of 2007, it is the longest bridge in Vilnius, 341.5 metres long and approximately 21.0 metres wide. The bridge has six spans: the major one, 100.0 metres long is over the river, the second one is on the left bank and four-span viaduct is on the right bank. It is made of ferroconcrete blocks, connected by wire fibers into inseparable ferroconcrete beams.

Sources
 "Lietuvos TSR kultūros ir paminklų sąvadas", Vilnius, Vyriausioji enciklopedijų redakcija,1988, p. 72 

Bridges completed in 1972
Road bridges in Lithuania
Bridges in Vilnius
Bridges built in the Soviet Union